Frunze is a rural locality (a village) in Kaltymanovsky Selsoviet, Iglinsky District, Bashkortostan, Russia. The population was 163 as of 2010. There are 5 streets.

Geography 
Frunze is located 20 km south of Iglino (the district's administrative centre) by road. Kaltymanovo is the nearest rural locality.

References 

Rural localities in Iglinsky District